Perfil (In English: "Profile") is the compilation album from Brazilian singer Ana Carolina, available in 2003 in Brazil and 2005 in World, for the profile series, the label Som Livre.

The album has three songs from other albums have release of the singer ("Ana Carolina", "Ana Rita Joana Iracema e Carolina" and "Estampado").

Track listing

Charts

Year-end charts

Certifications

References

2003 compilation albums
Ana Carolina albums